Sinfonia Amazônica, or Amazon Symphony, was Brazil's first animated feature-length film, produced entirely by Anélio Latini Filho over five years and finished in 1951. Like Disney's Fantasia, it tells several folk stories over orchestral music. The Brazilian television show Animania broadcast several clips of the film. It is currently in the process of restoration.

Voice cast
Almirante
Jaime Barcellos
Sadi Cabral
Estelinha Egg
Bartolomeu Fernandes
Pascoal Longo
Matinhos
Estevão Matos
Nero Morales
Antônio Nobre
Paulo Roberto
Abelardo Santos
José Vasconcelos

References

External links
Sinfonia Amazônica on IMDb
Sinfonia Amazônica in The New York Times
Company responsible for the restoration of Feature Film

1951 animated films
1951 films
Brazilian animated films
Brazilian children's films
1950s children's animated films
1950s Portuguese-language films